Amanda (Mandi) Hannula (25 March 1880, in Huittinen – 9 January 1952) was a Finnish schoolteacher and politician. She was a member of the Parliament of Finland from 1919 to 1930 and again from 1936 to 1945, representing the National Progressive Party. She also contributed to the family magazine Kotiliesi.

References

1880 births
1952 deaths
People from Huittinen
People from Turku and Pori Province (Grand Duchy of Finland)
National Progressive Party (Finland) politicians
Members of the Parliament of Finland (1919–22)
Members of the Parliament of Finland (1922–24)
Members of the Parliament of Finland (1924–27)
Members of the Parliament of Finland (1927–29)
Members of the Parliament of Finland (1929–30)
Members of the Parliament of Finland (1936–39)
Members of the Parliament of Finland (1939–45)
Finnish people of World War II
Finnish schoolteachers
20th-century Finnish women politicians
Women members of the Parliament of Finland